The 2010–11 MTN Elite 1 is the 51st season of the Cameroonian Premier League, top football division in Cameroon.

Team changes

Promoted to 2010–11 Elite One
Lausanne Youandé
Scorpion FC
Caïman Douala

Relegated from 2009–10 Elite One
AS Matelots
Fovu Baham
Roumdé Adjia FC

Clubs

League table

External links
2009–10 in Cameroonian football at Rec.Sport.Soccer Statistics Foundation
Soccerway.com

Cam
1
1
Elite One seasons